Europestar is a Chinese automotive sub-brand of the British Lotus Group plc.

The vehicles are manufactured in the prefecture-level city of Jinhua. The brand name is only used for export models. The Chinese homeland units are branded as Lotus Cars. The actual British sports cars of the Lotus brand are imported by the company and retain its UK original logo. In addition, the sport models are marketed under the differentiated heading of Lotus Sports Cars.

The RCR (based on the Proton Gen-2) and Jingyue (a Proton Persona) were shown under the new respective names of Lotus L3 5-door and L3 4-door at the 2010 Beijing Auto Show. At the same time the larger L5 sedan and liftback, developed by Lotus Group, had its premier.

Model Overview

References

External links
Official website of Youngman Lotus & Europestar

Car manufacturers of China
Youngman
Lotus Cars
Vehicle manufacturing companies established in 2008
Luxury motor vehicle manufacturers